United Nations Security Council resolution 1003, adopted on 5 July 1995, after reaffirming all resolutions on the situation in the former Yugoslavia, in particular resolutions 943 (1994), 970 (1995) and 988 (1995), the Council noted measures by the Federal Republic of Yugoslavia (Serbia and Montenegro) to continue the border closure with Bosnia and Herzegovina and therefore extended the partial suspension of sanctions against Serbia and Montenegro for an additional 75 days until 18 September 1995.

It was noted that the border remained closed, except to humanitarian relief and the efforts of Serbia and Montenegro in this regard. The Council underlined the importance it attached to there being no provision of military assistance to Bosnian Serb forces. At the same time, streamlined procedures adopted by the committee established in 724 (1991) were welcomed, concerning legitimate humanitarian assistance requests and transshipment on the Danube River.

Acting under Chapter VII of the United Nations Charter, the international sanctions placed on Serbia and Montenegro were suspended until 18 September 1995. The resolution also called for the mutual recognition between the states of the former Yugoslavia, with recognition between Bosnia and Herzegovina and Serbia and Montenegro being an important first step in the process. The situation would remain constantly under review by the Security Council.

Resolution 1003 was adopted by 14 votes to none against, with one abstention from Russia.

See also
 Bosnian War
 Breakup of Yugoslavia
 Croatian War of Independence
 List of United Nations Security Council Resolutions 1001 to 1100 (1995–1997)
 Yugoslav Wars

References

External links
 
Text of the Resolution at undocs.org

 1003
 1003
1995 in Yugoslavia
1995 in Bosnia and Herzegovina
 1003
July 1995 events
Sanctions against Yugoslavia